Pseudocomotis chingualana is a species of moth of the family Tortricidae. It is found in Ecuador.

The wingspan is about 21.5 mm. The ground colour of the forewings is white and is preserved in the form of fasciae with pale orange inner dots. The distal third of the wing is suffused and reticulate brown, with some white and orange dots. The hindwings are whitish, in the distal part strigulated (finely streaked) with brownish grey.

References

Moths described in 2009
Chlidanotini